Kondotty is a developing town, municipality, and aerotropolis in the Malappuram district state of Kerala, India which is located near Calicut International Airport, 24 km from Malappuram. It is the headquarters of Kondotty Taluk, which was declared as the seventh taluk in Malappuram district by chief minister Oommen Chandy on 23 December 2013.

Nediyiruppu region of Kondotty municipality was the original headquarters of the powerful dynasty of the Zamorins of Calicut (Eradi dynasty), who were actually the rulers of Eranad. The royal family of Zamorins is also known as Nediyiruppu Swaroopam.

Kondotty is famous for the Kondotty Nercha (Malayalam for 'offering') in the Pazhayangadi Mosque. Kondotty is the birthplace of the Mappila poet, Moyinkutty Vaidyar, where there is a memorial dedicated to him. He popularised Mappilapattu (Mappila songs) by his poems on secular and romantic themes.

History 

The history of Kondotty is connected with that of the 18th century Kondotty Thangals, the Sufi exponents. Tipu Sultan of Mysore brought the first Thangal Muhammad Shah, to make the Mappilas allies. The Thangal first resided at Areekode and later settled in Kondotty. When the British arrived, putting an end to the reign of Tipu Sultan, the Thangal realigned with the British. During the 1921 upsurge, the Mappila mob attacked the house of the seventh Thangal, Nasiruddin Shah.

Nediyiruppu is 2 km from Kondotty. It is from where the Zamorin kingdom was expanded. During the ancient times, Zamorins were known as Nediyiruppu Swaroopams.

Civic administration

Kondotty Municipality Election 2020

Climate 
The district has more or less the same climatic conditions prevalent elsewhere in the state: dry season from December to February, hot season from March to May, and the South West Monsoon from October to November. The South West Monsoon is usually very heavy and during which nearly 75 percent of the annual rains are received. The climate is generally hot and humid, with the temperatures ranging between 30 °C and 20 °C. The average annual rainfall is 290 mm.

Transport

Air 

Calicut International Airport (also known as Karipur International Airport) is located about 3 km from the town. Almost all international flights operating from the airport are to Middle East destinations targeting the large NRI population of north Kerala working in the Middle East.

Rail 
Feroke and Parappanangadi are the nearest railway stations.

Road 
Kondotty is well connected to nearby places through roads. National Highway 213 which connects Malappuram with Kozhikode and Palakkad passes through Kondotty.

Government

Government 
 Kerala State Haj Committee (Haj House), Airport Road
 District Panchayath Press, 17th Mile
 Mappila Kala Academy (Maha Kavi Moyinkutty Vaidyar Smarakam), Pandikkad Street
 Kondotty Block Panchayath Office Pandikkad Street
 Kondotty Taluk Headquarters, Block Office Road
 Assistant Educational Office, Pazhayangadi Street
 Office of the Circle Inspector of Police, Main Road
deputy supridentent of police main road 
 Office of the Circle Inspector of Excise, 17th Mile
 Sub Registrar Office, Kurupath Street
 Legal Metrology Office, Kurupath Street
 Kondotty Munisipal Office, Pandikkad Street, Kondotty.
sub regional transport office musliyarangadi.
taluk civil suply office poyilikkavu street.

Other government administrative offices 

 ICDS Office, EMEA School Road, Thurakkal Street, Kondotty.

Citizen service centers 
 Kondotty Akshaya e Kendra Akshaya project, Hilal Building, bypass road
 BSNL Customer Service Centre, Telephone Exchange Building, Pandikkad Street
 Sub Treasury office, Kuruppath
 (KSEB) Kondotty division office Kaloth

Education 
Kondotty is an emerging education hub with many government and non-government schools, colleges and other educational institutions.

Schools 
 Panakkad Pookoya Thangal Memorial Higher Secondary School (PPMHSS), Kottukkara Street.
 Govt.L.P.School Kondotty, Near Kuruppath
 Govt.U.P.School Kondotty, Kandhakkad, Near Post Office Kondotty
 Govt.L.P.School Thurakkal, Between Calicut Air port road and Thurakkal street.
 Al Hidaya English medium school, Thurakkal
 Bukhari English School, 1 Mile Street.
 E. M. E. A. Higher Secondary School, Thurakkal Street.
 GVHSS Kondotty, Melangadi Street.
 Alungal AMLPS
 
 Markazul Uloom Senior Secondary English School, Ekkaparamba Street.
 A.M.L.P School Neerad Street.
 Government UP School Neerad, Muthuvalloor
 Government UP School Neerad Street.
Floreat international Senior Secondary school Valiyaparamba Street.
Calicut Airport Senior Secondary School, Karippur Street.

Colleges 
 Blossom College of Arts and Science (affiliated to Calicut University), Neerad Street Kondotty
 E.M.E.A College of Arts and Science (affiliated to Calicut University), Kumminiparamba Street Kondotty
 Government arts and science college Kondotty (GASCK) Vilayil, Kondotty.
 SAFI College Vazhayoor, Kondotty.
 IHRD College Muthuvallur, Kondotty.
 jamia jalaliyya (SMIC) mundakkulam ,Kondotty.

University 
 The University of Calicut is located 10 km from Kondotty at Thenjipalam Malappuram Dt.

Places of interest

Pazhayangadi Mosque 

Situated at Kondotty, Pazhayangadi Mosque is believed to date back to the 18th century. It is also called the Kondotty mosque. This mosque is dedicated to a Muslim saint, Muhammad Shah, popularly called as Kondotty Thangal.

Maha Kavi Moyinkutty Vaidyar Smaraka 
The Maha Kavi Moyinkutty Vaidyar Smaraka is a memorial building dedicated to Moyinkutty Vaidyar (1852–1892), often referred to as Mahakavi (great poet), is historically considered one of the most renowned poets of the Mappila pattu genre of Malayalam language.

Kondotty Qubba 
Kondotty Nercha is a week-long festival held every year at Kondotty Qubba, which contains the tomb of the first Thangal, Muhammad Shah. Thousands of devotees attend the Nercha, which consists of certain religious processions. A very elaborate village fair is also arranged during the festival.  The festival is organized by Sunni Muslims and Hindus jointly. Certain small Muslim groups of the area like the Salafis boycott the festival because they don't believe in Dargahs.

Mini Ooty 
Mini Ooty is a tourist site in Arimbra Hills about 10 kilometres from Kondotty. It is at a height of 1000 feet above sea level. Mini Ooty attracts a large number of visitors because of its rolling hills and scenic views. The location got its name as it resembles Ooty, one of the famous hill stations in India. There are many stone crushers and plantations atop the hill. There is an old Harijan Colony on the western side of the hill.

Poyilikkave Karinkali Temple 

Poyilikkave Karinkali Temple is a very ancient temple in Nediyiruppu, constructed during the Zamorins period. The headquarter of Zamorins was at Nediyiruppu Swaroopam and connected to that this temple was very important. Worshipping Goddess Karinkali devi and Thalapoli festival is a very important temple ceremony in December of every year.

Other landmarks 
 Thakkiyakkal Rahmaniyya Higher Secondary Madrasa
 Masjidul Fathah, Kondotty Town
 Ayyappa Subramanya Shiva Temple, Pathinezham Mile
 Masjidhul Ihsan, Old Kondotty Road
 Kaloth Hills, Areacode Road
 Masjidhul Qubha (ഖുബാ മസ്ജിദ്) (Kondotty Markkas) near Moyinkutty vydhyar Smarakam (Malayalam: മഹാ കവി മോയി൯കുട്ടി വൈദ്യ൪ സ്മാരകം), Kondotty
 KHASIYARAKAM MASJID

Nearby places 

 Areekode, Arimbra Hills, Cheekkode and Cherukavu
 Edavannappara, Elamaram, Kavanoor and 
 Aroor, Olavattoor
 Kizhuparamba, Kondotty, Kottupadam, Kuzhimanna and Kizhissery
 Morayur, Muthuvallur, Nediyiruppu, Omanoor and Perakamanna
 Peruvallur, Pulikkal, Thiruthiyad, Urangattiri, Vazhakkad and Vazhayur
 Vettilappara and Vilayil
 Neerad
 Muthuvalloor
 Pulikkal
 Mundakkulam
 Parathakkad
 Moochikkal

Image gallery

Location

See also 
 Kondotty (State Assembly constituency)
 Areekode
 Kuzhimanna Kizhissery
 Nediyiruppu
 Pulikkal
 Edavannappara
 Omanoor

References

External links 
 Official website

Cities and towns in Malappuram district
Kondotty area